Demerit may refer to:

 Demerit good, in economics
 Demerit point, awarded for driving infractions in some countries
 Demerit (school discipline)
 negative merit in Buddhism and in Hinduism

People with the surname
 Jay DeMerit, American soccer player
 John DeMerit, former pro baseball player

See also
 
 
 Merit (disambiguation)